There are more than 145 public schools in Louisville, Kentucky, servicing nearly 100,000 students in kindergarten through 12th grade (K–12) education. The primary public education provider is Jefferson County Public Schools (JCPS).

Schools are typically categorized as elementary, middle or high schools, though some exceptions exist. J. Graham Brown School offers education for all grades in one school. Moore Traditional School is a combined middle and high school (formerly two separate schools). The Anchorage School is the sole school of AISD, educating for grades K-8.

Elementary schools
Public elementary schools provide education through fifth grade (approx. age 11, depending on the student). Some elementary schools offer pre-kindergarten programs.

Middle schools
Middle schools provide education for grades 6-8, typically ages 11–14.

High schools
High school begins at grade 9 (approx. age 14), running through grade 12 (approx. age 18).

Other/combined

See also
 List of schools in Louisville, Kentucky

References

 
Louisville
Louisville, Kentucky-related lists
Louisville, public